James B. Keller (born 1958/1959) is an American microprocessor engineer best known for his work at AMD and Apple. He was the lead architect of the AMD K8 microarchitecture (including the original Athlon 64) and was involved in designing the Athlon (K7) and Apple A4/A5 processors. He was also the coauthor of the specifications for the x86-64 instruction set and HyperTransport interconnect. From 2012 to 2015, he returned to AMD to work on the AMD K12 and Zen microarchitectures.

Education 
He holds a B.S. in Electrical Engineering from Pennsylvania State University which he earned in 1980.

Career 
Jim Keller joined DEC in 1982, and worked there until 1998, where he was involved in designing a number of processors, including the VAX 8800, the Alpha 21164 and the Alpha 21264 processors. Prior to DEC, he had worked at Harris Corporation on microprocessor boards. In 1998 he moved to AMD, where he worked to launch the AMD Athlon (K7) processor and was the lead architect of the AMD K8 microarchitecture, which also included designing the x86-64 instruction set and HyperTransport interconnect mainly used for multiprocessor communications.

In 1999, he left AMD to work at SiByte to design MIPS-based processors for 1 Gbit/s network interfaces and other devices. In November 2000, SiByte was acquired by Broadcom, where he continued as chief architect until 2004.

In 2004 he moved to serve as the Vice President of Engineering at P.A. Semi, a company specializing in low-power mobile processors. In early 2008 Keller moved to Apple. P.A. Semi was acquired by Apple shortly afterwards, reuniting Keller with his prior team from P.A. Semi. The new team worked to design the Apple A4 and A5 system-on-a-chip mobile processors. These processors were used in several Apple products, including iPhone 4, 4S, iPad and iPad 2.

In August 2012, Jim Keller returned to AMD, where his primary task was to lead development of new generation of x86-64 and ARM microarchitectures called Zen and K12. After years of being unable to compete with Intel in the high-end CPU market, the new generation of Zen processors has restored AMD's ability to do just that. On September 18, 2015, Keller departed from AMD to pursue other opportunities, ending his three-year employment at AMD.

In January 2016, Keller joined Tesla, Inc. as Vice President of Autopilot Hardware Engineering.

In April 2018, Keller joined Intel, where he served as Senior Vice President. He resigned from Intel June 2020 officially citing personal reasons. Though later it was reported that he left over a dispute on whether the company should outsource more of its production.

Jim Keller joined Tenstorrent as CTO in December 2020,  and became its CEO in January 2023.

In 2023, Keller and Sam Zeloof founded Atomic Semi, a foundry that aimed to design and manufacture low-cost fabrication equipment.

Personal life 
Jim Keller's wife, Bonnie, is the sister of Canadian author and clinical psychologist Jordan Peterson.

External links 
 An AnandTech Interview with Jim Keller: 'The Laziest Person at Tesla', by Dr. Ian Cutress on June 17, 2021

References 

Living people
AMD people
21st-century American engineers
Apple Inc. employees
Computer hardware engineers
Digital Equipment Corporation people
Intel people
Tesla, Inc. people
1950s births
Year of birth missing (living people)